Brian Colleary is an American former football coach and college athletics administrator. He  served as the head football coach at  Iona College in New Rochelle, New York from 1979 to 1983, compiling a record of 26–21–2.  Colleary was the athletic director at Marist College in Poughkeepsie, New York from 1985 to 1989 and Duquesne University in Pittsburgh, Pennsylvania from 1989 to 2005.  He graduated from Fordham University in 1974.

Head coaching record

References

Year of birth missing (living people)
Living people
Duquesne Dukes athletic directors
Fordham Rams football players
Iona Gaels football coaches
Marist Red Foxes athletic directors
St. John's University (New York City) people
High school football coaches in New York (state)